The spotted ctenotus (Ctenotus olympicus)  is a species of skink found in Australia.

References

olympicus
Reptiles described in 1999
Taxa named by Mark Norman Hutchinson
Taxa named by Steve Donnellan (scientist)